Matteo Ferro (Rovigo, 9 July 1992) is an Italian rugby union player.
His usual position is as a Flanker and he currently plays for Rovigo Delta in Top12 with the role of Captain.

In 2012, Ferro was named in the Italy Under 20 squad and in 2014 he was also named in Emerging Italy squad for 2014 IRB Tbilisi Cup

References 

 It's Rugby France Profile
 Eurosport Profile

1992 births
Living people
Italian rugby union players
Rugby union flankers